The second season of the Vinland Saga anime television series is produced by MAPPA. Despite the studio change, the series retained its main production staff from the previous season. The series is directed by Shūhei Yabuta, with Hiroshi Seko handling series composition, Takahiko Abiru designing the characters and Yutaka Yamada composing the music. Taking place a year after the events of the first season, the season primarily focuses on a slave from England named Einar as he meets the protagonist, Thorfinn, while working in a farm.

In July 2021, Twin Engine announced that a second season of the series was in production. Shūhei Yabuta is returning as director, and Takahiko Abiru is returning as character designer. In May 2022, it was announced that MAPPA would be taking over as the production studio for the second season. It premiered on January 10, 2023, on Tokyo MX, BS11, and GBS. The season will run for 24 episodes. The opening theme is "River" by Anonymouz, while the ending theme is "Without Love" by LMYK.


Episode list

Notes

References

External links
  
  
 

Vinland Saga